WBNJ (91.9 FM, "WBNJ 91.9") is an American radio station broadcasting to the Monmouth/Ocean County, New Jersey market with 4,500 watts from a 226-foot tower located along New Jersey Route 72 in Barnegat, New Jersey. The station airs an adult standards music format.

The station's primary service area ranges from Toms River to Atlantic City along the Jersey Shore but can also be heard well inland as far as Pemberton, Medford, and Atco, New Jersey. WBNJ features top of the hour news reports from ABC News Radio and during drive times, provides local news updates from Micromedia Publications of Lakehurst, New Jersey.

References

External links 
WBNJ official website
News Provider: Micromedia Publications, Inc.

BNJ
Adult standards radio stations in the United States
Radio stations established in 2010